Chloroxiphite is a rare olive green to pistacio green lead copper halide mineral with formula: Pb3CuO2Cl2(OH)2.

It was first discovered in 1923 in the Mendip Hills, Somerset, England associated with mendipite. Like mendipite it is an oxychloride mineral and formed from the alteration of lead ore (galena) by secondary oxidation.  In addition to mendipite, it occurs with diaboleite, parkinsonite, wulfenite, cerussite and hydrocerussite.  Its name comes from the Greek words (χλωρός) "green", describing its color, and (ζιφος) "blade" as its crystal form is long blade-like crystals that often show the growth pattern and time taken to form.

References 

Lead minerals
Copper(II) minerals
Halide minerals
Monoclinic minerals
Minerals in space group 11